The 2003 Penn State Nittany Lions football team represented the Pennsylvania State University in the 2003 NCAA Division I-A football season. The team's head coach was Joe Paterno. It played its home games at Beaver Stadium in University Park, Pennsylvania.

Preseason
The offense returns five starters, including quarterback Zack Mills, who was on pace for a record-shattering season before injuring his left throwing arm, and with the emergence of Larry Johnson, the Nittany Lions practically stopped throwing the ball. But in addition to losing Johnson, who won the Maxwell Award, the Doak Walker Award, the Walter Camp Award, and finished third in the Heisman Trophy balloting, the offensive unit also loses its leading receiver Bryant Johnson and four starters on the offensive line. Top candidates to replace Johnson include junior Mike Gasparato and true freshmen Austin Scott and Tony Hunt. Defensive tackle Levi Brown was moved to left tackle to help shore up the offensive line.

Penn State started the season ranked No. 25 in the Coaches college football preseason poll and was unranked in the AP college football preseason poll.

Recruiting class

Schedule
Penn State did not play Big Ten teams Illinois and Michigan this year.

‡ The game was not televised but was webcast on ESPN.com.

Roster

Game summaries

Temple

Penn State played four tailbacks to beat the Owls 23–10. Zack Mills was 7 of 16 for 79 yards and a touchdown. Backup quarterback Michael Robinson, who started at tailback, led the team with 84 yards rushing. True freshman Austin Scott was next with 69 yards on a team-high 12 carries. Fifth-year senior Ricky Upton had 19 yards on four carries, and true freshman Tony Hunt had 12 yards on three carries. This would be the only game of 2003 in which Penn State never once trailed.

Boston College

The Boston College Eagles jumped out to an early lead against a flat Penn State team, as the Eagles won 27–14. The Eagles went up 21–0 with 7:50 left in the first quarter, amassing 206 of its 383 total yards by the end of the first quarter. Zack Mills was 15 of 28 for 144 yards but was benched in favor of Michael Robinson in the third quarter. Robinson led the Lions to a touchdown but going only 4 of 11 for 41 yards. Penn State was inside the Boston College 30 five times and came away with only 14 points.

Nebraska

The Cornhuskers running game dominated Penn State, as the Huskers won 18–10. Nebraska rushed for 337 yards on 72 carries and held the ball twice as long as Penn State, who managed only 44 yards on 21 carries.

Kent State

Austin Scott made his first career start as Penn State erased a 10-point deficit to beat the Golden Flashes 32–10. Scott rushed for 100 yards on 21 carries with three touchdowns. Fullback Sean McHugh added 49 yards on nine carries and a touchdown. Redshirt freshman cornerback Maurice Humphrey made his first appearance at receiver and produced three receptions for 37 yards. Michael Robinson was used strictly as a quarterback, finishing 2 of 9 for 29 yards, alternating with Zack Mills who finished 10 of 20 for 99 yards.

Minnesota

Michael Robinson got his first significant playing time under center, in relief of an injured Zack Mills whose left knee was sprained in the second quarter and did not return, but it wasn't enough to beat the Golden Gophers as the Lions lost 20–14. Robinson finished 16 of 27 for 178 yards but with two interceptions. He also had 42 yards rushing on 12 carries and a touchdown.

Wisconsin

Penn State's special teams broke down as the Badgers won 30–23. The Lions special teams allowed a punt returned for a touchdown, fumbled a punt that led to another touchdown, had two missed field goals and a missed extra point. The defense couldn't stop Wisconsin's running game, allowing 234 yards on the ground, 119 from Wisconsin's third-stringer Booker Stanley. Overshadowed was Michael Robinson's superb performance in his first start at quarterback. Robinson finished 22 of 43 for 379 yards, two touchdowns and no interceptions. His 379 passing yards ranked second on Penn State's all-time list at the time.

Purdue

The Boilermakers defense held the Penn State offense to only 204 total yards as Purdue won 28–14. Michael Robinson, starting at quarterback for the second straight week, was held to only 98 yards passing on 10 of 32 attempts. Purdue, known mostly as a passing team, rushed for 234 yards, compared to Penn State's 125 yards rushing. Tony Hunt led the team with 47 yards on nine carries.

Iowa

The Hawkeyes defense dominated the Penn State offense as Iowa goes on to win 26–14. The Lions led after the first quarter when safety Yaacov Yisrael returned an interception 83 yards for a touchdown. Penn State and starting quarterback Michael Robinson started their first three possessions in Iowa territory but couldn't move the ball and had a fumble returned that set up Iowa's first touchdown. Robinson was replaced by Zack Mills, who went 14 of 25 for 138 yards and a touchdown in the final three quarters, but the team failed to mount a serious comeback.

Ohio State

Zack Mills regained the starting position, but it wasn't enough as the Buckeyes defeated the Lions 21–20. Mills was 27 of 43 for 253 yards, becoming the school's all-time leader in completions with 406, passing Tony Sacca. He also moved past Todd Blackledge into fourth place in passing yards with 4,973. Mills also moved into second place in total offense with 5,482 yards. Converted cornerback Maurice Humphrey had seven receptions for 64 yards, and little-used Terrance Phillips had his first career reception and finished with two catches for 47 yards. On defense, Alan Zemaitis returned an interception 78 yards for a touchdown. Kickoff specialist David Kimball made the first field goal of his career, replacing Robbie Gould in all kicking roles.

Northwestern

The Nittany Lions, in control most of the game, couldn't hold off the Wildcats as the Wildcats scored 17 points in the final seven minutes to win 17–7. Zack Mills finished 22 of 36 for 230 yards passing and an interception but also rushed for Penn State's lone score. Maurice Humphrey led Penn State with eight receptions for 97 yards but dropped two passes including one that would have been a touchdown. Michael Robinson started at tailback and finished with 15 rushes for 47 yards, five receptions for 55 yards, and was 1 for 1 for 11 yards passing. Fullback Sean McHugh led the team in rushing with 79 yards on 10 carries.

The defense forced three Wildcat turnovers. Paul Posluszny made eight tackles, including one for a loss and a crucial stop on fourth-and-1. Yaacov Yisrael led the Lions with 15 tackles forced a fumble.

Indiana

On senior day Penn State scored on offense, defense, and special teams, as they rolled over the Hoosiers 52–7. After the Hoosiers jumped to a 7–0 lead, Penn State piled on 52 unanswered points. Zack Mills was 12 of 19 for 173 yards, three touchdowns and no interceptions. Michael Robinson started at tailback and rushed for 85 yards and a touchdown. Robinson was also 2 of 3 passing for 87 yards and a touchdown. Senior Tony Johnson had three receptions, all for touchdowns, totaling 47 yards.

On special teams, Robbie Gould kicked a 37-yard field goal. Yaacov Yisrael also blocked a punt, that Andrew Guman recovered and returned seven yards for a touchdown. Linebacker Paul Posluszny also returned an interception 15 yards for a touchdown.

Michigan State

Robbie Gould gave the Lions a 3–0 lead, but it was all Michigan State Spartans after that en route to a 41–10 victory over the Nittany Lions. The Lions defense could not stop the Spartans, as Michigan State quarterback Jeff Smoker completed 29 of 50 for 357 yards and four touchdowns. Zack Mills finished 11 of 24 for 114 yards, becoming Penn State's career leader in total offense and also moved into second place on the school's passing yardage list.

Awards

Watchlists

Gino Capone
Dick Butkus Award watchlist
Robbie Gould
Lou Groza Award watchlist
Zack Mills
Davey O'Brien Award watchlist
Derek Wake
 Dick Butkus Award watchlist

Players

Dave Costlow
Second-team CoSIDA Academic All-American
First-team CoSIDA Academic All-District
 Gino Capone
First-team CoSIDA Academic All-District
Michael Robinson
Second-team CoSIDA Academic All-District
 Gio Vendemia
Second-team CoSIDA Academic All-District
Yaacov Yisrael
Second-team All-Big Ten (conference coaches selection)
Alan Zemaitis
Second-team All-Big Ten (conference media selection)

Post season
Penn State finished the season with a 3–9 record, 1–7 in the Big Ten, Paterno's worst ever at Penn State. It was the third losing season in the past four, and only Paterno's fourth losing season since joining the coaching staff in 1950. Nine losses were the most ever for a Penn State team, breaking the record set by the 1931 2–8 team. The season ended without any wins in road games, which hadn't occurred since 1936.

Despite the losing record, Penn State claimed second place in football attendance for the third consecutive season, averaging 105,629 through seven home games, ranking in the top four for the 13th consecutive year. The Ohio State game drew Penn State's largest home crowd of 108,276, the seventh largest crowd ever in Beaver Stadium.

The team's second-leading receiver Maurice Humphrey, after a promising season at wide receiver was expelled from school and convicted of three counts of simple assault. Humphrey would not play another down for Penn State.

NFL draft
Four Nittany Lions were drafted in the 2004 NFL Draft.

All-star games

See also
 Uplifting Athletes

References

Penn State
Penn State Nittany Lions football seasons
Penn State Nittany Lions football